Shannon Boatman (born November 24, 1984) is a former Canadian football offensive tackle. He was signed by the Washington Redskins as an undrafted free agent in 2008. He played college football at Florida State.

Professional career

Toronto Argonauts 
Boatman spent the 2009 season on the Toronto Argonauts practice roster. He played 5 games in 2010. He was cut by the Argos during 2011 training camp.

Omaha Nighthawks 
Boatman was signed by the Omaha Nighthawks of the United Football League on July 5, 2011.

Winnipeg Blue Bombers 
Boatman signed with the Blue Bombers on July 4, 2012.

References

External links 
Just Sports Stats
Florida State Seminoles bio

1984 births
Living people
People from Beaumont, Texas
Players of American football from Texas
American players of Canadian football
Florida State Seminoles football players
American football offensive tackles
Canadian football offensive linemen
Washington Redskins players
Toronto Argonauts players
Omaha Nighthawks players
Winnipeg Blue Bombers players